Patricia Bevilacqua (born 24 March 1965) is a Brazilian judoka. She competed in the women's half-lightweight event at the 1992 Summer Olympics.

References

External links
 

1965 births
Living people
Brazilian female judoka
Olympic judoka of Brazil
Judoka at the 1992 Summer Olympics
Sportspeople from Rio de Janeiro (city)
Pan American Games medalists in judo
Pan American Games silver medalists for Brazil
Medalists at the 1991 Pan American Games
Judoka at the 1991 Pan American Games
20th-century Brazilian women
21st-century Brazilian women